Diarmuid McCarthy (1956 – 9 July 2022) was an Irish Gaelic footballer who played at club level with Naomh Abán and Muskerry and at inter-county level with the Cork senior football team. He usually lined out as a forward.

Career

McCarthy first played Gaelic football at juvenile and underage levels with Naomh Abán. He was just 17-years-old when he was part of the club's adult team that won the Cork JFC title in 1973 before later winning a Cork IFC title in 1977. His performances at club level also earned inclusion on the Muskerry divisional team. 

McCarthy first appeared on the inter-county scene during a two-year tenure with the Cork minor football team. He was at centre-forward when Cork beat Mayo in the 1974 All-Ireland minor final. He also spent two years with the Cork under-21 team. McCarthy made his senior team debut during the 1982 Munster SFC. He was an unused substitute for Cork's defeat of Kerry in the 1983 Munster final. McCarthy ended his inter-county career as captain of the Cork junior football team that beat Warwickshire in the 1989 All-Ireland junior final.

Death

McCarthy died after a long illness on 9 July 2022, aged 66.

Honours

Naomh Abán
Cork Intermediate Football Championship: 1977
Cork Junior Football Championship: 1973
Mid Cork Junior A Football Championship: 1973, 1988
Mid Cork Under-21 football Championship: 1973

Cork
 Munster Senior Football Championship: 1983
 All-Ireland Junior Football Championship: 1989 (c)
 Munster Junior Football Championship: 1989 (c)
 All-Ireland Minor Football Championship: 1974
 Munster Minor Football Championship: 1973, 1974

References

1956 births
2022 deaths
Naomh Abán Gaelic footballers
Muskerry Gaelic footballers
Cork inter-county Gaelic footballers